Robert Grierson Combe  (5 August 1880 – 3 May 1917) was a Canadian recipient of the Victoria Cross, the highest and most prestigious award for gallantry in the face of the enemy that can be awarded to British and Commonwealth forces. Combe is also considered Scottish since he was born in Aberdeen, Scotland.

Details
Combe was 36 years old, and a lieutenant in the 27th Battalion, Canadian Expeditionary Force during the First World War when the following deed took place for which he was awarded the VC.

On 3 May 1917, south of Acheville, France, Lieutenant Combe steadied his company under intense fire and leading them through the enemy barrage reached the objective with only five men. He proceeded to bomb the enemy, inflicting heavy casualties and then, collecting small groups of men, succeeded in capturing the objective, together with 80 prisoners. He repeatedly charged the enemy, driving them before him, but while personally leading his bombers he was killed by a sniper.

Combe was buried in a battlefield cemetery near Acheville close where he was killed, but later fighting saw the cemetery destroyed and his grave site lost. As such, R.G. Combe's name is inscribed on the Canadian National Vimy Memorial along with the names of the other Canadian soldiers who were killed in France and whose bodies were never recovered or identified or whose graves were lost.  The battlefield on which Lt. Combe fell is just over seven kilometres away from the Vimy Monument, and on a clear day Acheville can be seen from the monument itself.

The medal
Combe's medal is held by the Provincial Archives in Regina, Saskatchewan and is displayed on special occasions.  It is the only publicly held Victoria Cross in the province.

References

Further reading 
Monuments to Courage (David Harvey, 1999)
The Register of the Victoria Cross (This England, 1997)
Scotland's Forgotten Valour (Graham Ross, 1995)

External links
 Robert Grierson Combe digitized service file
 Legion Magazine article on Robert Combe

1880 births
1917 deaths
Canadian Expeditionary Force officers
Canadian military personnel killed in World War I
Canadian World War I recipients of the Victoria Cross
Military personnel from Aberdeen
Scottish emigrants to Canada